Žvingiai is a town in Šilalė district municipality, Tauragė County, Lithuania. According to the 2011 census, the town has a population of 195 people.

References

Towns in Lithuania
Towns in Tauragė County